Woodlawn Cemetery may refer to:

Canada
 Woodlawn Cemetery (Saskatoon)
Woodlawn Cemetery (Nova Scotia)

United States
(by state then city or town)
 Woodlawn Cemetery (Ocala, Florida), where Isaac Rice and family are interred
 Woodlawn Cemetery (Tampa, Florida)
 Woodlawn Cemetery (West Palm Beach, Florida)
 Woodlawn Cemetery (Carbondale, Illinois), listed on the National Register of Historic Places (NRHP) in Jackson County, Illinois
 Woodlawn Cemetery (Forest Park, Illinois), including Showmen's Rest
 Woodlawn Cemetery Gates and Shelter, Washington, Iowa, listed on the NRHP in Washington County, Iowa
 Woodlawn Cemetery (Mound City, Kansas), documented by the Historic American Landscapes Survey
 Woodlawn Cemetery (Westbrook, Maine)
 Woodlawn Cemetery (Woodlawn, Baltimore County, Maryland)
 Woodlawn Cemetery (Acton, Massachusetts)
 Woodlawn Cemetery (Clinton, Massachusetts)
 Woodlawn Cemetery (Everett, Massachusetts)
 Woodlawn Cemetery (Wellesley, Massachusetts)
 Woodlawn Cemetery (Detroit)
 Woodland Cemetery (Monroe, Michigan)
 Woodlawn Cemetery (Summit, Mississippi), where T. R. Stockdale is interred
 Woodland Cemetery (Flathead County, Montana)
 Woodlawn Cemetery (Las Vegas, Nevada), listed on the NRHP in Clark County, Nevada
 Woodlawn Cemetery (Nashua, New Hampshire)
 Woodlawn Cemetery (Bronx, New York), New York, a National Historic Landmark listed on the NRHP
 Woodlawn Cemetery (Canandaigua, New York)
 Woodlawn Cemetery (Elmira, New York), which includes the Woodlawn National Cemetery, all together listed on the NRHP
 Woodlawn Cemetery (Orchard Park, New York)
 Woodlawn Cemetery (Syracuse, New York), where Peter Kappesser is interred
 Woodlawn Cemetery (Ada, Ohio)
 Woodlawn Cemetery (Toledo, Ohio), listed on the NRHP in Lucas County, Ohio
Woodlawn Cemetery (Washington, D.C.), listed on the NRHP in Washington, D.C.
 Woodlawn Cemetery (Fairmont, West Virginia), listed on the NRHP in Marion County, West Virginia
Woodlawn Cemetery (Green Bay, Wisconsin)
Woodlawn Cemetery (Titusville, Pennsylvania)

Similar names 
Woodlawn Baptist Church and Cemetery, Nutbush, Tennessee, listed on the NRHP in Haywood County, Tennessee
 Woodlawn Garden of Memories Cemetery, Houston, Texas, listed on the NRHP in Harris County, Texas
Woodlawn Memorial Cemetery, Santa Monica, California
Woodlawn Memorial Park Cemetery, Colma, California
 Woodlawn Memorial Park Cemetery, Nashville, Tennessee
Woodlawn Memorial Gardens, Norfolk, Virginia

See also 
 Woodland Cemetery (disambiguation)
 Woodlawn (disambiguation)